The grand prix du théâtre is a theatre award established in 1980 by the Foundation Le Métais-Larivière and awarded annually to a playwright in recognition for his/her body of work. The Académie française is responsible for selecting the winner.

Laureates 

1980: Jean Anouilh
1981: Gabriel Arout
1982: Georges Neveux 
1983: Marguerite Duras
1984: Jean Vauthier
1985: René de Obaldia
1986: Raymond Devos
1987: Rémo Forlani and Jean-Claude Brisville
1988: Loleh Bellon
1989: Edric Caldicott and François Billetdoux
1990: Jean-Claude Brisville
1991: Jean-Claude Grumberg
1992: non attributed
1993: Fernando Arrabal
1994: non attributed
1995: 
1996: non attributed
1997: Didier Van Cauwelaert
1998: Romain Weingarten
1999: non attributed
2000: Yasmina Reza
2001: Éric-Emmanuel Schmitt
2002: Jean-Michel Ribes
2003: Victor Haïm
2004: non attributed
2005: Jean-Marie Besset
2006: Michel Vinaver
2007: Valère Novarina
2008: non attributed
2009: Wajdi Mouawad
2010: Philippe Minyana
2011: Denise Chalem
2012: Marie NDiaye
2013: Armand Gatti
2014: Éric Assous
2015: Joël Pommerat
2016: Pascal Rambert
2017: Philippe Caubère
2018: Hélène Cixous
2019: Édouard Baer
2020: Enzo Cormann

External links 
Prix du théâtre on the site of the Académie française.

Awards established in 1980
French theatre awards
Dramatist and playwright awards